"När en flicka talar skånska" (When a girl speaks Scanian) written by the Ystad singer-songwriter Michael Saxell is a southern Swedish song and was made famous by the singer Danne Stråhed, who released it as a single in 1993. In 1993, it was recorded by Wizex on the album Vår hemmagjorda dansmusik.

Other recordings
Exportz orkester in 1997.
Agaton Band in 2004.
Michael Saxell in 2008 with Jalle Lorensson.

References

Swedish songs
Swedish-language songs
Wizex songs